The table below lists the hospitals located in the Ivory Coast.

Gallery of hospitals

References

Medical and health organizations based in Ivory Coast
Ivory Coast